Goulds may refer to:

 Goulds, Florida, United States
 Goulds, Newfoundland and Labrador, Canada

See also

 Gould (disambiguation)
 Goulds Pumps
 Goulds Road